Greg Cox is an American politician and businessman from San Diego, California. He served as a member of the San Diego County Board of Supervisors for District 1 from 1995-2020. He is a member of the Republican Party, but has also been endorsed by prominent local Democratic politicians. He was not eligible to run in the 2020 election due to term limits. He was succeeded by Democrat Nora Vargas.

Career

Mayoralty
Cox served as mayor of Chula Vista, California from 1981 until 1990. He was investigated in 1997 by the state Fair Political Practices Commission for failing to include a $2.2 million commercial Home Federal Savings loan in his interest disclosure; he admitted making an "oversight", but was eventually cleared by the Commission of any wrongdoing. After his resignation in 1990, he worked as Director for Local Government in the state Office of Planning and Research.

County Supervisor
As County Supervisor, he has voted to fund a number of regional construction projects and programs intended to address homelessness in the county. He was the sole dissenter in a 2018 Board of Supervisors vote siding with the administration of President Donald Trump against California's sanctuary state law, Senate Bill 54; Cox called the vote a waste of money, and expressed the concern that it could increase distrust of law enforcement. In 2016, he reported himself to a watchdog group and paid a $3,000 fine after realizing he had failed to disclose a conflict of interest relating to a vote on a permit for SeaWorld San Diego, in which his wife, Cheryl Cox—also a former mayor of Chula Vista—held stock. In campaigns, he has stressed his support for the development project in the Chula Vista Bayfront, for law enforcement, and for environmental protection regulations.

Cox's constituency, District 1, includes the cities of Coronado, Imperial Beach, Chula Vista, National City and communities within San Diego including Barrio Logan, Chollas View, Grant Hill, La Playa, Lincoln Park, Logan Heights, Memorial, Mount Hope, Mountain View, Nestor, Otay Mesa, Palm City, Point Loma, San Ysidro, Shelltown, Sherman Heights, Southcrest, Stockton, Sunset Cliffs and parts of downtown San Diego. The district also includes the unincorporated communities of Bonita, Sunnyside, Lincoln Acres, and East Otay Mesa.

Other ventures
Cox is the incumbent president of the National Association of Counties, a nonprofit organization that represents county governments in federal affairs. In this role, he has focused on helping counties improving services for constituents. As president of the NACo, he is advised by consultant and former San Diego County administrator Walt Ekard, at the expense of San Diego County. Cox is also a former president of the California State Association of Counties and League of California Cities.

References

Living people
California Republicans
San Diego County Board of Supervisors members
San Diego State University alumni
Year of birth missing (living people)
Mayors of Chula Vista, California